In their first season in existence as Livingston F.C., they competed in the Scottish Third Division. They also competed in the Challenge Cup, League Cup and the Scottish Cup.

Summary
At the end of the 1994–95 season, having run into severe financial difficulties, Meadowbank Thistle were facing closure. The club relocated to a new stadium in the new town of Livingston and changed their name for the second time in their history to Livingston F.C.

In their first season in the Third Division, having been relegated the previous season, Livingston finished top of the league and were promoted to the Second Division. They reached the third round of the League cup and the second round of the Scottish Cup.

Results & fixtures

Second Division

League Cup

Scottish Cup

Statistics

League table

References

Livingston
Livingston F.C. seasons